Nigel Linge  is Professor of Telecommunications at the University of Salford. He is a specialist in computer networking and telecommunications heritage.

Early life
Linge was educated at Wolsingham Comprehensive School and then at the University of Salford where he obtained a degree in Electronics in 1983. He subsequently completed his PhD there in 1987 for a thesis on the subject of "The interconnection of local area networks using bridges".

Career
Linge is Professor of Telecommunications at the University of Salford. He is a specialist in computer networking and telecommunications heritage about which he has written two books with Andy Sutton. He is a Chartered Engineer and was elected Fellow of the Institution of Engineering and Technology, Fellow of the British Computer Society, and Fellow of the Higher Education Academy.

Selected publications
 30 Years of Mobile Phones in the UK. Amberley Publishing, 2015. (With Andy Sutton) 
 The British Phonebox. Amberley Publishing, 2017. (With Andy Sutton)

References

Alumni of the University of Salford
Academics of the University of Salford
Fellows of the British Computer Society
Fellows of the Higher Education Academy
Fellows of the Institute of Engineering and Technology
Living people
Year of birth missing (living people)